Alfred Kälin (born 16 January 1949) is a former Swiss cross-country skier who competed in the early 1970s. He won a bronze medal in the 4 x 10 km relay at the 1972 Winter Olympics in Sapporo. He also competed at the 1976 Winter Olympics.

References

External links
Max Bardone Fan Club on the 1972 4 x 10km bronze (Switzerland) 

1949 births
Living people
Cross-country skiers at the 1972 Winter Olympics
Cross-country skiers at the 1976 Winter Olympics
Olympic medalists in cross-country skiing
Swiss male cross-country skiers
Medalists at the 1972 Winter Olympics
Olympic bronze medalists for Switzerland
Olympic cross-country skiers of Switzerland